Velas Sudamerica 2010 or Regata del Bicentenario Velas Sudamerica 2010 or, more commonly, Regata del Bicentenario, was a 2010 historic tall ship gathering and touring of Latin America to celebrate the bicentennial of the first national governments of Argentina and Chile, assembled in May and September 1810, respectively. The event was organized by the Argentine and Chilean navies.

Route

The touring performed around the Latin American continent for nearly five months (traveling about 15,000 nautical miles) and visited thirteen regional ports. It began on 7 February 2010 in Rio de Janeiro, headed south to the South Atlantic, turned around Cape Horn to reach the Pacific Ocean (although some ships chose to cross through the Strait of Magellan for safety reasons), and headed north to cross the Panama Canal and finish on June 28 in Veracruz.

Participants

Notes and references

External links 
  

Sailing festivals
Tall ships
Sports festivals in Chile
Sports festivals in Argentina